The Derry Intermediate Football Championship (currently also known for sponsorship reasons as the M&L Contracts Derry Intermediate Football Championship) is an annual competition between the mid-tier Gaelic football clubs affiliated to Derry GAA.

Format
The competition traditionally took the structure of an open-draw knock-out.

In 2007 and 2008, the championship was altered to include a round robin, group structure with the 16 teams divided into four groups. Each club in a group played each other once with the top two in each group advancing to the quarter-finals. From the quarter-finals onwards the competition took the format of a knock-out.

The format was changed once again for the 2009 Championship. The Derry Competitions Control Committee accepted a proposal to scrap the group stage and introduce a "backdoor" system. The 16 clubs play in the first round. In the second round the eight first round winners are drawn against each other, with the four winners going into bowl A for the quarter-finals. The eight first round losers are also drawn against each other and the four winners advance to the quarter-finals (in bowl B). Teams in bowl A are drawn out against teams from bowl B to make up the quarter-final draw. Thereafter the competition is an open-draw knock-out.

Honours
The trophy awarded to the Derry IFC winning team is named after John Bateson (aged 19), James Sheridan (20) and Martin Lee (18), all members of the South Derry Brigade of the Provisional Irish Republican Army who died in an explosion in Magherafelt on 18 December 1971. All three men came from Ballymaguigan and played for the St Trea's GFC Ballymaguigan.

The winners of the Derry Intermediate Championship qualify to represent their county in the Ulster Intermediate Club Football Championship. It is the only team from the county to qualify for this competition. The Derry IFC winner may enter the Ulster Intermediate Club Football Championship at either the preliminary round or the quarter-final stage. They often do well there, with Steelstown (January 2022, following 2021 Derry IFC win), Craigbane (2000 and 2011) and Eoghan Rua, Coleraine (2006) all winning Ulster titles since the turn of the century, after winning the Derry Intermediate Football Championship. The winners can, in turn, go on to play in the All-Ireland Intermediate Club Football Championship, at which it would enter at the semi-final stage, providing it hasn't been drawn to face the British champions in the quarter-finals. Steelstown, for instance, won the 2022 All-Ireland title, after winning the Derry Intermediate Football Championship of the previous year.

List of finals

 The 2004 final went unplayed, Foreglen were awarded that year's title.

References

Derry GAA club championships
2
Intermediate Gaelic football county championships